Theodore Kosloff (born Fyodor Mikhailovich Kozlov, ; January 22, 1882 – November 22, 1956) was a Russian-born ballet dancer, choreographer, and film and stage actor. He was occasionally credited as Theodor Kosloff.

Career
Born in Moscow in 1882, Kosloff began his professional ballet career after training at Moscow's Imperial Theater. After graduating in 1901, he began touring internationally with the Diaghilev Ballet Company which he had joined in 1909. He was a preferred partner of Tamara Karsavina.

After arriving in the United States in 1909, Kosloff was introduced to influential film director Cecil B. DeMille by the actress and writer Jeanie MacPherson. DeMille was also encouraged to sign Kosloff due to the persistence of his young niece Agnes de Mille, who was an ardent fan of the ballet dancer. DeMille was immediately impressed by the dark-haired young dancer and quickly put Kosloff to work as an actor. Kosloff's first role was in the 1917 DeMille directed The Woman God Forgot opposite the popular American singer and actress, Geraldine Farrar. In Hollywood, Kosloff began a romantic relationship with the American future set-and costume designer and Mrs. Rudolph Valentino, Natacha Rambova. The two danced on the vaudeville stage together. The affair however, was brief and tumultuous.

By December 1912, Kosloff was reported to be the choreographic director of La Saison Russe, preparing a short run of American premiers of operas and ballets for Spring 1913 in New York, in coordination with Morris Gest. The pre-season announcement promised Mussorgsky's Khovanshchina and Boris Godunov, Rimsky-Korsakov's Sadko and The Tsar's Bride, Anton Rubinstein's Demon, Alexander Borodin's Prince Igor and Mikhail Glinka's Ruslan and Lyudmila.

Kosloff also worked steadily during his acting career as a choreographer and between 1912 and 1916 choreographed several Broadway musicals: The Passing Show of 1915 (1915–1916), A World of Pleasure (1915–1916) and See America First (1916). From 1918 through 1919 Kosloff also appeared on the stage as an actor in the revival of The Awakening.

In early 1923, the Los Angeles Times reported that Kosloff had been offered the throne of the Tatars. He traveled to New York City in February of that year, where he saw his brother and fellow dancer Alexis Kosloff and met with representatives of the Liberal party of Kazan. Fearing the resistance of the Conservative party, Kosloff turned down the offer, saying: "I could be Khan, but it is doubtful for how long. And I decided I would rather be a live motion-picture actor than a dead king!"

Kosloff's career as a film actor spanned the 1920s and Kosloff often appeared as the leading man opposite such well renowned actresses as Nita Naldi, Gloria Swanson, Bebe Daniels and Anna Q. Nilsson. With his dark hair and complexion, the ballet dancer was often cast in more exotic roles, often as a "Latin lover" type, Eastern European prince or noble, or Arabic sheik. Kosloff's acting career often relied heavily on DeMille procuring roles for him in his films. Indeed, the majority of Kosloff's film roles are in DeMille directed films.

Kosloff's acting career came to an end with the advent of sound film. Studio executives were reluctant to cast him in roles because of his pronounced Russian accent. His last substantial on-screen role was a dance role playing "Electricity" clad in a Futurist costume in the Zeppelin dance scene of De Mille's MGM movie-musical flop Madam Satan. Kosloff's last film role was an uncredited role as a dance instructor in the 1937 Gregory La Cava directed Stage Door, opposite Ginger Rogers, Katharine Hepburn and Adolphe Menjou.

He was the partner with madame Matilda Kshesinskaya who still lived in Paris, France. Since 1917, he consulted motion picture producers like Cecil B. De Mille and one of the last movies he was involved with was, up until his death The Ten Commandments.

Later years and death
After retiring from acting, Kosloff continued to work as a choreographer and opened a successful ballet school in Los Angeles, where choreographer Flower Hujer was one of his students.

On Thanksgiving morning 1956, Theodore Kosloff was taken to Hollywood Hospital where he died at the age of 74 and was interred at Valhalla Memorial Park Cemetery in North Hollywood.

Legacy
He was survived by his estranged wife Madame Maria Baldwin (also spelled Baldina), and a brother Alexis Kosloff from Woodstock, New York.

For his contribution to the motion picture industry, Theodore Kosloff was given a star on the Hollywood Walk of Fame located at 1617 Vine Street, in Hollywood, California.

Partial filmography

The Woman God Forgot (1917) - Guatemoco
The Tree of Knowledge (1920) - Adam
Why Change Your Wife? (1920) - Radinoff
The City of Masks (1920) - Bosky
The Prince Chap (1920) - Yadder
Something to Think About (1920) - Clown
Forbidden Fruit (1921) - Pietro Giuseppe
The Affairs of Anatol (1921) - Mr. Nazzer Singh - Hindu Hypnotist
Fool's Paradise (1921) - John Roderiguez
The Lane That Had No Turning (1922) - Louis Racine
The Green Temptation (1922) - Gaspard
The Dictator (1922) - Carlos Rivas
To Have and to Hold (1922) - Lord Carnal
Law of the Lawless (1923) - Sender
Children of Jazz (1923) - Richard Forestall
Hollywood (1923) - Theodore Kosloff
Adam's Rib (1923) - Jaromir XIII - Deposed King of Morania
Don't Call It Love (1923) - Luigi Busini
Triumph (1924) - Varinoff
Feet of Clay (1924) - Bendick
The Golden Bed (1925) - Marquis de San Pilar
New Lives for Old (1925) - De Montinbard
Beggar on Horseback (1925) - Prince in Pantomime
The Volga Boatman (1926) - Stefan, A Blacksmith
The Little Adventuress (1927) - Antonio Russo
The King of Kings (1927) - Malchus - Captain of the High Priest's Guards
Woman Wise (1928) - Abdul Mustapha
Madam Satan (1930) - Electricity
Stage Door (1937) - Dance Instructor (uncredited) (final film role)

See also
List of Russian ballet dancers

References

External links

Theodore Kosloff at the New York Times Movies

Theodore Kosloff at Virtual History

1882 births
1956 deaths

American male ballet dancers
American choreographers
American male film actors
American male silent film actors
American male stage actors
Male actors from the Russian Empire

Male ballet dancers from the Russian Empire

Burials at Valhalla Memorial Park Cemetery

Choreographers from the Russian Empire
20th-century American male actors
Emigrants from the Russian Empire to the United States
20th-century American dancers